The English grain aphid (Sitobion avenae) is an aphid in the superfamily Aphidoidea in the order Hemiptera. It is a true bug and sucks sap from plants. It lives on grasses, sedge and rushes and can be a significant pest of cereals.

This species act as a host of the entomophthoralean fungi.

Parthenogenesis

Some genotypes of S avenae are obligate parthenogens and some are cyclical parthenogens.  Cyclically parthenogenetic lines can reproduce parthenogenetically in the spring and summer.  Production of sexual females and males is induced during autumn by decreasing day length and decreasing temperature.  Mating followed by egg laying occurs on grasses (Poaceae) during late November. Eggs can overwinter with delayed development (diapause), and then, after being exposed to cold for two or three months, can hatch spontaneously and initiate the next cycle of clonal reproduction.

References 

 http://aphid.aphidnet.org/Sitobion_avenae.php
 http://www7.inra.fr/hyppz/RAVAGEUR/6sitave.htm
 http://www.agroatlas.ru/en/content/pests/Sitobion_avenae/
 http://entoweb.okstate.edu/ddd/insects/englishgrainaphid.htm

Agricultural pest insects
Macrosiphini
Insect pests of millets